Swanley Village  is a village in the Sevenoaks District of Kent, England. It is located 1 mile north east of Swanley & 4.7 miles south west of Dartford.

History
Swanley Village was originally known as Swanley but with the arrival of the London, Chatham and Dover Railway line, specifically the junction between the Chatham Main Line and the Maidstone East Line to the west of the village, a new settlement grew up. This was called "Swanley Junction", but soon grew and became known as "Swanley", with the village thus becoming known as "Swanley Village". Its church is dedicated to St Paul. The local pubs are "The Lamb" and "The Red Lion".

Transport

Rail
The nearest National Rail station is Swanley, located 1.4 miles away.

Buses
Whilst no buses serve Swanley Village directly, the Arriva Kent Thameside route 477 passes the west of the village boundary, connecting it with Bluewater, Dartford, Orpington & Swanley.

External links

St Pauls church

Villages in Kent
Swanley